Drivers Edge Development is a NASCAR driver development program formed in a joint venture between Chevrolet, JR Motorsports and GMS Racing. The program aims to groom the next generation of racing superstars through a tiered competition pipeline coupled with comprehensive off-track education. Participants in the program have options to race in five types of developmental series with entries fielded by the two teams. The tiers include JRM’s regional late model team, GMS’s NASCAR Craftsman Truck Series teams, and JRM’s NASCAR Xfinity Series teams. Off the track, drivers have access to a host of programs focusing on their physical, mental and technical development with an emphasis on brand building and support for partner procurement and retention.

The inaugural class of drivers, which was announced on January 24, 2019, were Noah Gragson, John Hunter Nemechek, Zane Smith, Sheldon Creed, Sam Mayer, and Adam Lemke. An ARCA Menards Series driver named Carson Hocevar also joined the organization later on in 2019. As of 2023, the current class of drivers include Rajah Caruth, Daniel Dye, Carson Kvapil, and Sam Mayer.

References

External links 
 Official Website
 JR Motorsports Website
 GMS Racing Website

ARCA Menards Series
Driver's education
NASCAR
Racing schools